
Year 459 BC was a year of the pre-Julian Roman calendar.  At the time, it was known as the Year of the Consulship of Vibulanus and Uritinus (or, less frequently, year 295 Ab urbe condita).  The denomination 459 BC for this year has been used since the early medieval period, when the Anno Domini calendar era became the prevalent method in Europe for naming years.

Events 
 By place 
 Persian Empire 
 The Jewish priest Ezra assembled and led a band of approximately 5,000 Jews from Babylon to Jerusalem.

 Greece 
 Athens allied itself with the city state of Megara which was under pressure from Corinth. This alliance leads to war between Corinth and Athens. The first battle of the war, at Haliesis in the Gulf of Argolis, resulted in a Corinthian victory, but the next battle, the battle of Cecryphalea (modern Angistrion), went Athens' way.

 Roman Republic 
 The Aequi occupied Tusculum.  In response to the threat, the Roman Senate decided to send an army to help the allied city, under the command of consul Lucius Cornelius Maluginensis.  In addition, the consul Fabius Vibulanus, who was at that point besieging Antium, moved his forces to attack Tusculum.  The Tusculans were able to recapture their city.  A truce was then arranged with the Aequi.

 Sicily 
 The Sicilian town of Morgantina was destroyed by Ducetius, Hellenised leader of the Siculi (according to Diodorus Siculus).

Births

Deaths

References 

 
Ezra–Nehemiah